The following is a list of Major League Baseball players, retired or active. As of the end of the 2011 season, there have been 45 players with a last name that begins with Q who have been on a major league roster at some point.

Q

References

External links
Last Names starting with Q – Baseball-Reference.com

 Q